The Karkur junction bus bombing was a suicide attack on October 21, 2002, at the Karkur junction near Wadi Ara, Israel. The attack, carried out by Islamic Jihad, killed 14 passengers and wounded 50.

The attack 
Egged commuter bus 841 was on its way on Route No. 65 from Kiryat Shmona to Tel Aviv when it stopped at the Karkur junction, about 8 kilometers from Hadera at the afternoon rush hour. A passenger got on and spoke to driver Chaim Avraham, but before he could answer, a jeep loaded with an estimated 100 kilograms of TNT rammed the back of the bus, causing an explosion. A fire broke out, causing a chain of explosions from the ammunition carried by soldiers who were riding the bus. The explosion ignited the fuel tank, leaving the bus completely gutted. The blaze initially prevented the police and rescue workers from approaching the bus, which was reduced to a blackened skeleton.

7 Israeli soldiers and 7 civilians were killed in the attack and 50 passengers were wounded.

The terrorist attack came two days before United States Assistant Secretary of State William J. Burns was due to visit Israel as part of a tour of Middle East nations, seeking support for an invasion of Iraq.

The perpetrators 
The military wing of Palestinian Islamic Jihad, the Al-Quds Brigades, claimed responsibility for the attack, saying that it was carried out by Ashraf al-Asama, 18, and Mohammed al-Hasnin, 19, both from the West Bank city of Jenin.

Official reactions 
The Palestinian Authority said it condemned the suicide bombing. An Israeli official expressed skepticism, declaring that "The Palestinian Authority has become a prime authority on terror and could not care less about preventing it."

See also
Civilian casualties in the Second Intifada
Israeli casualties of war

External links
 16 Die After Car Blast Causes Bus Fire In Israel - published on the Milwaukee Journal Sentinel on October 22, 2002
 Suicide car-bomb attack kills 14 in Israel - published on The Independent on October 22, 2002
 Bus Blast in Israel Kills at Least 14; Explosive-Laden Vehicle Sets Off Rush-Hour Inferno; 50 Injured - published on The Washington Post on October 22, 2002
 Terror attack kills 14 in Israel - published on CNN on October 22, 2002
 Suicide bombing of Egged bus No 841 at Karkur junction - published at the Israeli Ministry of Foreign Affairs

References

Mass murder in 2002
Attacks on buses by Palestinian militant groups
Israeli casualties in the Second Intifada
Palestinian suicide bomber attacks against buses
Terrorist attacks attributed to Palestinian militant groups
Terrorist incidents in Israel in 2002
Suicide car and truck bombings in Israel
October 2002 events in Asia
Islamic terrorism in Israel